EnvisionTEC is a privately held global company that develops, manufactures and sells more than 40 configurations of desktop and production 3D printers based on seven several distinct process technologies that build objects from digital design files. Founded in 2002, the company now has a corporate headquarters for North America, located in Dearborn, Mich., and International headquarters in Gladbeck, Germany. It also has a production facility in the Greater Los Angeles area, as well as additional facilities in Montreal, for materials research, in Kiev, Ukraine, for software development, and in Woburn, Mass, for robotic 3D printing research and development. Today, the company's 3D Printers are used for mass customized production and to manufacture finished goods, investment casting patterns, tooling, prototypes and more. EnvisionTEC serves a variety of medical, professional and industrial customers. EnvisionTEC has developed large customer niches in the jewelry, dental, hearing aid, medical device, biofabrication and animation industries. EnvisionTEC is one of the few 3D printer companies globally whose products are being used for real production of final end-use parts.

Technology 

Since it filed its first patent in 1999, EnvisionTEC has developed and brought to market several new additive manufacturing technologies used for 3D printing.

Three of those technologies are based on harnessing light as a tool to cure liquid resin into a three-dimensional object based on a digital design files.

 In 2002, EnvisionTEC started producing Perfactory printers using Texas Instruments DLP projectors. In this process, a vat of liquid photopolymer or resin is cured by projecting images from a digital light source to solidify the photopolymer voxel by voxel, resulting in a solid object. This DLP 3D printing process allows for extremely high resolution, excellent surface finish, and intricate details, making it a popular technology among makers of products requiring high resolution, excellent surface finish and intricate details.
 Because the resolution delivered by DLP technologies begins to taper off as the size of the final object grows, or the light source moves away from the part being built, EnvisionTEC later developed Scan, Spin and Selectively Photocure (3SP) technology, which launched in 2013 to 3D print larger objects while maintaining quality. With 3SP, a multi-cavity laser diode with an orthogonal mirror spinning at 20,000 rpm reflects the beam through a spinning drum, where the light passes through a series of optical elements, focusing the light onto the surface of the photopolymer across the Y direction. An Imaging Light Source (ILS) contains a multi-cavity laser diode, its driver, and all optics. The ILS travels in the X direction at 1-2 inches per second, depending on the material being cured, while the laser light scans the Y direction and selectively photo-cures liquid resin based on the data path.
 In June 2016, EnvisionTEC unveiled another patented breakthrough—Continuous Digital Light Manufacturing (cDLM) technology—with the launch of the Micro Plus cDLM at the JCK Las Vegas tradeshow. EnvisionTEC first filed for a patent on its Continuous Digital Light Manufacturing technology in 2006, and a patent was issued in 2011. The CLDM technology allows continuous movement of the build platform in the Z axis, which allows for faster build speeds and isotropic properties in the Z axis that allow 3D printed parts to compete more directly with injection molded parts. Together, the fast build times and isotropic nature of the builds also opens the door for new dual-cure materials that were previously not possible with standard DLP printing. By the end of 2017, EnvisionTEC's family of cDLM printers had grown to include the Micro cDLM, the Vida HD cDLM and the Vida cDLM, with each printer offering unique features for jewelry, dental and manufacturing customers.  
EnvisionTEC has also been developing and expanding its process technology beyond DLP and light-based curing technologies, too.

The company's 3D-Bioplotter series now includes a Starter, Developer and Manufacturing model that extrude materials in three dimensions using pressure. Materials range from a viscous paste to a liquid, and are inserted using syringes moving in three dimensions. Air or mechanical pressure is applied to the syringe, which then deposits a strand of material for the length of movement and time the pressure is applied. Parallel strands are plotted in one layer. For the following layer, the direction of the strands is turned over the center of the object, creating a fine mesh with good mechanical properties and mathematically well-defined porosity. The 3D-Bioplotter is frequently used in biofabrication and is being used in a wide range of medical research. Scientists from Northwestern University, for example, have created 3D printed ovary implants using an EnvisionTEC 3D-Bioplotter that may be used one day to treat women experiencing infertility.

Products 
EnvisionTEC sells more than 40 configurations of 3D Printers that sell for between $6,299 and $1 million. The company's printers are organized into several families of printers: Desktops (Aria, Micro, Vida, Aureus, etc.); Perfactory; cDLM; 3SP; 3D-Bioplotter; and the SLCOM. EnvisionTEC also markets and sells the Viridis3D RAM123 under an "exclusive strategic partnership."

In early 2016, EnvisionTEC demonstrated a shift in its strategic direction with the launch of several new models of printers, including the 3D-Bioplotter Starter Series, the SLCOM 1 and RAM123. "Previously known as pioneers in the 3D printing technology of digital light processing (DLP), the U.S.-German company has managed to redefine itself once again by announcing three new platforms at the event: a new bioprinter, a 3D printer for sandcasting and, perhaps its most substantial unveil, a massive industrial 3D printer dedicated to composite manufacturing," according to Engineering.com.

Founder 

EnvisionTEC was founded by Hendrik John a German inventor and later managed by John and its current owner, Al Siblani, a Lebanese immigrant who came to the United States to complete his higher education. After earning a bachelor's degree in engineering at Lawrence Technological University and a master's degree in electrical and computer engineering from Wayne State University, both located in Metro Detroit, Siblani entered a 3D printing market still in its infancy. He began working in 1993, for an early 3D printing company, Helisys, that used Laminated Object Manufacturing (LOM) technology to create prototypes for automakers and other commercial customers. Shortly thereafter, he founded Sibco Inc., which provided 3D printing services and materials. In 1996, after mastering the 3D printing technologies and materials at the time, Siblani decided to make his own 3D printing machines using a then-novel idea to cure resins into objects. His first patent submission, which laid the foundation for EnvisionTEC, was filed in 1999. In 2015, Siblani was honored as a finalist for the Ernst & Young Entrepreneur of the Year program for the Michigan and Northwest Ohio region.

See also 

 Additive manufacturing
 3D printing
 Rapid prototyping
 List of 3D printer manufacturers

References 

3D printer companies
2002 establishments in Germany
Companies established in 2002
Companies based in North Rhine-Westphalia
German brands